The 2013 Northern Iowa Panthers football team represented the University of Northern Iowa in the 2013 NCAA Division I FCS football season. The team was coached by Mark Farley and played their home games in the UNI-Dome. They were a member of the Missouri Valley Football Conference. They finished the season 7–5, 3–5 in MVFC play to finish in a tie for seventh place.

Personnel

Roster
2013 Roster

Coaching staff

Season

Schedule

Ranking movements

References

Northern Iowa
Northern Iowa Panthers football seasons
Northern Iowa Panthers football